Avans University of Applied Sciences is a Dutch high ranked vocational university. It is located in three cities: Breda, 's-Hertogenbosch, and Tilburg. The school has over 30,000 students studying 40 courses in 18 institutes. There are 3,000 employees.

Avans University of Applied Sciences itself was founded on January 1, 2004, as a union of Hogeschool 's-Hertogenbosch and Hogeschool Brabant in Tilburg, Breda, and Etten-Leur. Hogeschool Brabant itself was a union from 1988 of Hogeschool West-Brabant (Etten-Leur and Breda) and Hogeschool Midden-Brabant (Tilburg). The oldest branch of Avans University of Applied Sciences is the Kunstacademie in 's-Hertogenbosch, which was founded on October 1, 1812.

Recognition and ranking
Avans University of Applied Sciences was declared by independent researcher Keuzegids HBO as the best major University of Applied Sciences in the Netherlands up till 2022.

English studies

Bachelor's (4 years) 
 Environmental Science for Sustainability, Ecosystems and Technology (ESSET), in Breda
 Industrial Engineering and Management, in Breda
 International Business and Languages, in 's-Hertogenbosch
 International Business and Management Studies, in Breda
 International Financial Management, in Breda

Master's 
The Master Institute of Visual Cultures awards degrees in the following:
 Master of Animation, in Breda & 's-Hertogenbosch 
 Master of Situated Design, in 's-Hertogenbosch 
 Master of Ecology Futures, in 's-Hertogenbosch 
 Master of Visual Arts and Post-Contemporary Practice, in 's-Hertogenbosch 

And has plenty of other courses (exchange) to offer, for example, courses like Biobased Energy, Bioinformatics, Biotechnology, Environmental Geography, Global Business & Career, International Business, International Sales, etc.

References

External links
  Official website
  Website for Students in Breda

 
Vocational universities in the Netherlands
Education in North Brabant
Buildings and structures in Breda
Buildings and structures in 's-Hertogenbosch
Buildings and structures in Tilburg
2004 establishments in the Netherlands